Turkey is an unincorporated community  in Breathitt County, Kentucky.  It is located on Kentucky Route 30, between the communities of Lerose and Shoulderblade.

Turkey lies on Terry Fork, a tributary to Turkey Creek, which is itself a tributary to the Middle Fork Kentucky River.  The fork forms a valley known as Deadening Hollow.

References 

Unincorporated communities in Breathitt County, Kentucky
Unincorporated communities in Kentucky